Pachydermodactyly is a superficial dermal fibromatosis that presents as a poorly circumscribed symmetric, infiltrative, asymptomatic soft-tissue hypertrophy of the proximal fingers, typically sparing the thumbs and fifth fingers and rarely extending proximally to the wrists or occurring distally.

See also
Skin lesion

References

External links
 A Case of Pachydermodactyly
Dermal and subcutaneous growths